The Doomsday Man is a fictional character appearing in American comic books published by Marvel Comics. Primarily an enemy of Carol Danvers, the character exists within Marvel's main shared universe, known as the Marvel Universe. Created by writer Stan Lee and artist John Buscema, the character first appeared in Silver Surfer #13 (February 1970).

Publication history 

The Doomsday Man was introduced in Silver Surfer #13 and reappeared in Ms. Marvel #3-4 in a two-part storyline that ended with it fusing with Professor Kerwin Korman, a villain who had previously appeared in Ms. Marvel #1-2 under the name the Destructor. The aggregate of the Doomsday Man and Korman was subsequently featured in a story-arc that took place in The Avengers (vol. 3) #15-17 before making its final appearance to date in Ms. Marvel (vol. 2) #11-12.

Fictional character biography 

After the Apollo 11 moon landing, the United States government commissioned Doctor John Kronton to create an automaton that could assist mankind with exploring and colonizing other worlds, a project supervised by Carol Danvers. When construction of the nigh-invincible robot was complete, Danvers, fearing that it could possibly turn against humanity, successfully convinced a Senatorial Commission to abandon the project and seal the android away with other apocalyptic weapons on a desolate island in the Pacific Ocean.

The robot (dubbed "the Doomsday Man" by the tabloids) activates and breaks free of its prison, taking with it a cobalt bomb. Learning of the Doomsday Man's existence, the Silver Surfer attempts to destroy it and prevent the detonation of the cobalt bomb with the assistance of Doctor Kronton, who eventually reveals that he had secretly programmed the Doomsday Man to awaken and threaten mankind, intending to stop it himself, thus becoming a hero in the eyes of the people of Earth. The Surfer separates the Doomsday Man from the cobalt bomb and attempts to trap it in a pit formed with his Power Cosmic. Doctor Kronton tries to help his creation climb back up to the surface and is killed by it when the Doomsday Man swats him away, an act that causes it to lose its grip and fall deep beneath the Earth's surface, while the Surfer safely disposes of the cobalt bomb.

A.I.M. acquires and gains control of the Doomsday Man, which they attach to a rocket set for the Kennedy Space Center. Carol Danvers, now the superheroine Ms. Marvel, intercepts the projectile, causing it to crash land near the Florida cave where she had first become Ms. Marvel. Recommencing her battle with the Doomsday Man, Ms. Marvel manages to deactivate it by attacking the weak point that had been secretly installed in the back of its head by Doctor Kronton. Ms. Marvel is then ambushed by Professor Kerwin Korman, a.k.a. the Destructor. Searching for the source of Ms. Marvel's powers, Korman stumbles onto and opens a spare energy core for the nearby Psyche-Magnitron, unleashing an explosive blast of radiation that launches Ms. Marvel out of the cave and fuses Korman with the Doomsday Man.

A.I.M. recovers the amalgam of the Doomsday Man and Korman and leaves a decoy in its place. The fake is later unearthed and destroyed by Captain Marvel.

A.I.M.'s leader, MODOK, eventually loses interest in the Doomsday Man, which is left abandoned beneath a warehouse in The Bronx. When the building is destroyed during an altercation involving A.I.M., the New Warriors, the Avengers and Lord Templar, the Doomsday Man escapes and, after concluding that Korman's usefulness as wetware is waning, sets out to replace him with Ms. Marvel.

The Doomsday Man breaks the Wrecking Crew out of prison and orders them to capture Ms. Marvel, who has since become Warbird. When the Wrecking Crew are cornered by the Avengers after mistakenly attacking Photon, the Doomsday Man attempts to execute them from afar to prevent them from revealing its existence and then abducts Warbird itself, bringing her to its base in the Bronx. As it and Warbird fight, the Doomsday Man rants about how it requires her to be complete and about how they both share "the Kree warrior's bond" due to being "born of the Psyche-Magnitron". The Avengers, having tracked Warbird down, arrive and manage to damage the Doomsday Man enough to incapacitate it and reveal the trapped Korman. Goliath begins studying the Doomsday Man to try and find a way to separate Korman from it, but his work is cut short when he is abducted by Ultron.

The Doomsday Man was subsequently reacquired by A.I.M. and once again placed in storage after the organization found itself unable to discern how to control it or how to replicate its fusion with Korman. After spending months in a vegetative state, Korman awoke, assumed control of his and the Doomsday Man's shared body and embarked on a rampage, intent on murdering both Warbird (who had gone back to being Ms. Marvel) and "a great number of people" by releasing the Targoth, infectious zombies that A.I.M. had manufactured for Slorenia.

Ms. Marvel combats Korman while her sidekick, Araña, destroys the Targoth. When Korman severely injures Araña, an enraged Ms. Marvel batters the Doomsday Man with a car, tears it open and nearly kills the exposed Korman, relenting at the last minute when the suicidal Korman whispers, "Heh... thank... you". Emergency services are able to stabilize Korman, who is later revealed to have been intentionally awakened and given control of the Doomsday Man by a rogue faction of A.I.M., which had also manipulated Ms. Marvel into fighting Korman as a part of a "test run" intended to gauge whether or not Korman would be of use against MODOK.

Powers and abilities 

As it was constructed to be able to withstand and function in every conceivable environment, the Doomsday Man is nigh-invulnerable and superhumanly strong. It also has a laser cannon mounted on its right arm and a "photonic nullifier" hidden within its mouth. A.I.M. provided the Doomsday Man with further armaments, including tachyon blasters attached to its head and gun-arm and the power to teleport itself and others.

Kerwin Korman merging with it increased the Doomsday Man's mental faculties, giving it a human-like mind and personality, as well as the ability to improvise. Korman himself was a genius inventor and engineer and, like Carol Danvers, he was mutated into a human-Kree hybrid entity via exposure to the radiation emitted by the Psyche-Magnitron.

References

External links 

 Doomsday Man at Comic Vine
 Doomsday Man at Marvel Wikia
 
 
 Destructor at Comic Vine
 Kerwin Korman at Marvel Wikia
 
 

Characters created by Stan Lee
Characters created by John Buscema
Comics characters introduced in 1970
Marvel Comics cyborgs
Fictional mass murderers
Marvel Comics characters with superhuman strength
Marvel Comics characters who can teleport
Marvel Comics robots
Marvel Comics weapons